Asier Córdoba Querejeta (born 31 March 2000) is a Spanish footballer who plays as a winger for SD Logroñés.

Club career

Athletic Bilbao
Córdoba was born in Bilbao, Biscay, Basque Country, and joined Athletic Bilbao's youth setup in 2010, from Askartza Claret CF. Initially promoted to the farm team ahead of the 2018–19 season, he started to play for the reserves in Segunda División B, and made his senior debut with the latter club on 29 September 2018 by starting in a 1–2 away loss against Real Oviedo Vetusta.

Córdoba scored his first senior goal 5 May 2019, netting the opener in a 3–0 away win against CD Calahorra. On 29 June 2020, he was released by the club as his contract was due to expire in the following day.

Osasuna
On 3 July 2020, Córdoba agreed to a three-year deal with CA Osasuna, initially assigned to the B-team in the third division. He made his debut for the B-side on 15 November, starting in a 0–1 away loss against SD Tarazona.

Córdoba made his first team debut on 15 December 2020, coming on as a half-time substitute for Juan Cruz in a 6–0 away routing of UD Tomares, for the season's Copa del Rey. The following 9 July, he terminated his contract with the club.

Alcorcón
On 9 July 2021, Córdoba signed for AD Alcorcón in Segunda División. He made his professional debut on 21 August, replacing Juan Hernández in a 0–2 home loss against CF Fuenlabrada.

On 31 January 2022, Córdoba left Alkor after terminating his contract.

Logroñés
On 31 January 2022, just hours after leaving Alcorcón, Córdoba joined Primera División RFEF side SD Logroñés.

Den Bosch
On 24 June 2022, Córdoba moved to a foreign club for the first time in his career, signing a two-year contract with Dutch second-tier Eerste Divisie club Den Bosch.

Return to Logroñés
On 8 January 2023, Córdoba returned to SD Logroñés.

Personal life
Córdoba has two brothers who are also footballers. His elder sibling Aitor (born 1995) is a central defender who graduated from the youth setup at SD Leioa and played in the second division with Burgos CF. His middle brother Iñigo is also a winger, and was also groomed at Athletic Bilbao. Their sister Ainhoa (born 2001) plays for Leoia's women's team in the Basque regional league.

References

External links

2000 births
Living people
Footballers from Bilbao
Spanish footballers
Association football wingers
Segunda División players
Primera Federación players 
Segunda División B players
Tercera División players
Eerste Divisie players
CD Basconia footballers
Bilbao Athletic footballers
CA Osasuna B players
CA Osasuna players
AD Alcorcón footballers
SD Logroñés players
FC Den Bosch players
Spanish expatriate footballers
Expatriate footballers in the Netherlands
Spanish expatriate sportspeople in the Netherlands